Florida Water is an American version of Eau de Cologne, or Cologne Water. It has the same citrus basis as Cologne Water, but shifts the emphasis to sweet orange (rather than the lemon and neroli of the original Cologne Water), and adds spicy notes including lavender and clove. The name refers to the fabled Fountain of Youth, which is said to be located in Florida, as well as the "flowery" nature of the scent.

In the Americas
Accord to current trademark holders, Lanman & Kemp Barclay, Florida Water was introduced by the New York City perfumer (and founder of the original company) Robert I. Murray, in 1808.  In 1835 Murray was joined by David Trumbull Lanman and the firm became Murray & Lanman, then David T. Lanman and Co.,  and in 1861 became Lanman & Kemp. The company states that their product, now sold under the Murray & Lanman brand, still uses the original 1808 formula, and that the current label is also a slightly modified version of the 1808 original.

Florida Water was regarded as a unisex cologne, suitable for men and women alike. Victorian etiquette manuals warne young ladies against the "offensive" impression made by a strong perfume, but Florida Water and Eau de Cologne were recommended as appropriate for all, along with sachets for scenting the linen and fresh flowers in the corsage. Large quantities were also used by barbershops as cologne and aftershave. In the 1880s and 1890s Murray & Lanman Florida Water was advertised as "The Richest of all Perfumes" and "The most Popular Perfume in the World".

Like other colognes of the era, Florida Water was valued for its refreshing and tonic nature as well as its scent, and could be used as a skin toner or as what we would now call a "body splash". It was also used as a toilet water (eau de toilette), by adding it to the bath or wash-water.

Use in religious practices
Florida water is occasionally used as a cleansing liquid in certain religious practices, most notably hoodoo. It may be used in a similar fashion to that practice's equivalent of holy water.

In East Asia 
Florida Water has also been manufactured in Hong Kong since the turn of the 20th century, the most famous of which is the hundred-year-old Kwong Sang Hong "Two Girls" Brand of Hong Kong.  Once a common household item throughout Hong Kong, particularly as a refreshing topical application on skins during summer months, "Two Girls" Florida Water remains moderately popular as a “retro” toiletry product in Hong Kong and Southeast Asia, complete with elaborate, nostalgic packaging designs.

China  
After the Chinese Communist Party took over mainland China in 1949, private cosmetic companies were all nationalized, brand names such as "Liu Shen", "Maxam" and "Butterfly" were then created and made popular.

The formulations in these products are quite different from Murray & Lanman and Two Girls, having morphed into a summertime skincare product containing menthol (or borneol) and traditional Chinese medicinal herbs. Such products are most commonly used for reliving itchiness caused by insect bites and miliaria. Further developments include formulations with added insect repellents.

References 

Perfumes
1808 introductions